Graeme Hall (9 February 1942 – 4 February 2015) was an Australian weightlifter. He competed in the men's middle heavyweight event at the 1964 Summer Olympics.

References

External links
 

1942 births
2015 deaths
Australian male weightlifters
Olympic weightlifters of Australia
Weightlifters at the 1964 Summer Olympics
Place of birth missing
20th-century Australian people
21st-century Australian people